Josep Manel Ayala Díaz (born 8 April 1980) is an Andorran international footballer. He currently plays as a midfielder for Inter Club d'Escaldes. Ayala formerly played for FC Santa Coloma, US Luzenac, CD Binéfar and FC Andorra. He made his international debut in 2002.

International career
Ayala was player of Andorra national football team. He had 84 caps. His last match was the Andorran victory against Hungary, the second official win in the history of the Andorran national team

References

External links

1980 births
Living people
Andorran footballers
Andorran expatriate footballers
FC Andorra players
Andorra international footballers
Luzenac AP players
FC Santa Coloma players
Association football midfielders
Inter Club d'Escaldes players
CD Binéfar players